The Rechthuis is a former courthouse in the village of Bellingwolde in the Netherlands. The building with two crow-stepped gables was established in 1643 and used as a civil court for the area Bellingwolde-Blijham until 1811. The building has been a national heritage site since 1972. It is currently used as a private residence.

Building 

The Rechthuis is located at the Hoofdweg, near the Magnus Church, in the center of the village of Bellingwolde in the east of the province of Groningen near the Dutch–German border. It is situated in the north of the region of Westerwolde.

The building was established in 1643. One side of the building has a 17th-century style, the other side has an 18th-century style. The building has been restored in 1956–1957 after it was dilapidated.

The rectangular building has a saddle roof with the ridge parallel to the road. On the short sides, it has crow-stepped gables with small windows, some of which have shutters. Both gables are dated "1643" with the numbers as anchor plates. In the one half of the building is a semi-basement with a room above it, in the other half of the building is a hall.

The Rechthuis has been a national heritage site since 1972. Part of the village of Bellingwolde including the Rechthuis has been a protected village area since 2009.

Use

Courthouse 
The Rechthuis was used as a courthouse for civil cases in the heerlijkheid of Bellingwolde-Blijham from 1643 to 1811. Before the current building was established, there might have been another courthouse at the same location as early as 1456.

The judge ( [sic]) of the courthouse was appointed by the city of Groningen and lived in the nearby Rigtersborg in Bellingwolde. In the hall of the building, he held three or four sessions per month and each session handled usually more than twenty cases. The courthouse was also used by the magistrate of Wedde.

In 1811, the courthouse in Bellingwolde was closed. The nearest court was now in the city of Winschoten.

Residence 
After the courthouse was closed, the building became private property. In 1937, the building was bought by the municipality of Bellingwolde. The building is currently again privately owned. As a private residence, it cannot be visited by the public.

References

External links 

 

Bellingwolde
Buildings and structures completed in 1643
Former courthouses in the Netherlands
Rijksmonuments in Groningen (province)
1643 establishments in the Dutch Republic